White Heart is the first album by the contemporary Christian music band White Heart and the band's only album with Steve Green on lead vocals, released in 1982 on Home Sweet Home Records. A year after its release, the album peaked at number 10 on the Top Inspirational Albums chart in Billboard magazine. White Heart was nominated for a Grammy for their debut album (their first of two nominations) for Best Gospel Performance by a Duo or Group at the 26th Grammy Awards.

Track listing
 "Hold On" (Mark Gersmehl) – 3:37 
 "You're the One" (Billy Smiley, Gersmehl) – 3:56 
 "Listen to the Lonely" (Smiley, Gersmehl) – 3:47 	
 "He's Returning" (Gersmehl) – 4:23
 "Carry On" (Smiley, Gersmehl) – 3:56
 "Guiding Light" (Smiley) – 3:40
 "Everyday" (co-lead vocals with Sandi Patti) (Smiley, Dann Huff, Gary McSpadden) – 4:08
 "Nothing Can Take This Love" (Smiley) – 3:40 
 "Black Is White" (Smiley, McSpadden, Michael W. Smith) – 3:14 
 "Go Down Ninevah" (Smiley) – 4:30

Personnel 
White Heart
 Steve Green – lead vocals (1, 2, 4, 5, 9, 10), backing vocals
 Mark Gersmehl – keyboards, synthesizer (4), organ (8), backing vocals
 Billy Smiley – keyboards, rhythm guitar (2, 10), backing vocals (6), lead vocals (6, 10), producer
 Dann Huff – lead and rhythm guitars, backing vocals, lead vocals (1, 3, 4, 7, 8, 10), producer
 Gary Lunn – bass 
 David Huff – drums, percussion (9, 10)

Additional Musicians
 Phil Naish – acoustic piano (7), Rhodes piano (7)
 Michael W. Smith – acoustic piano (9)
 Mark Morris – percussion (1, 3-5, 7, 8)
 Dennis Holt – percussion (8)
 Mello Mel – percussion (9)
 Sam Levine – saxophone (7)
 Sandi Patti – co-lead vocals (7)
 Greg Guidry – backing vocals (9)

Additional production
 Chris Christian – executive producer, mixing (1, 3-6, 8, 9, 10)
 Jeff Balding – recording (1-8), mixing (1, 3-6, 8, 9, 10)
 Scott Hendricks – recording (9)
 Mike Psanos – recording (10)
 Jack Joseph Puig – mixing (2, 7), mastering at MCA Whitney Recording Studios (Los Angeles, California)
 Michael Borum – photography 
 Kent Hunter – art direction, design

Charts

Radio singles

References

1982 debut albums
White Heart albums